Handball at the 2015 African Games is held from September 10–19, 2015 at several venues.

Participants
Ten men's and eleven women's teams qualified for the games, including host the country, the Republic of Congo.

Events

Schedule

Medal summary

Medal table

References

 
2015 African Games
Handball at the African Games
African Games
2015 in African handball
Handball in the Republic of the Congo